Philip Bryn Vaile  (born 16 August 1956) is an English sailor and Olympic Champion. He competed at the 1988 Summer Olympics in Seoul and won a gold medal in the Star class, together with Michael McIntyre representing Great Britain.

References

External links

1956 births
Living people
British male sailors (sport)
Sailors at the 1988 Summer Olympics – Star
Olympic sailors of Great Britain
English Olympic medallists
Members of the Order of the British Empire
Olympic gold medallists for Great Britain
Olympic medalists in sailing
Medalists at the 1988 Summer Olympics